Mukim Sungai Punggor or Sungai Punggur (also known as Mukim 11) is a mukim (Malay for subdistrict) located in Batu Pahat District in Johor, Malaysia. Batu Pahat District was divided into 14 mukims, each of which encompasses several villages. The population was 10,417 in 2010. The majority ethics of the population in the Sungai Punggor is Malay (8,887). The nearby towns is Bandar Rengit (east) and Bandar Senggarang (west).

Villages 
Sungai Punggor comprises the following populated village, among them are:

 Kampung Sungai Dulang Laut
 Kampung Sungai Dulang
 Kampung Parit Sri Bahrom Laut
 Kampung Parit Sri Bahrom.
 Kampung Parit Lapis Sri Bahrom
 Kampung Parit Sri Bahrom Darat
 Kampung Parit Sri Bahrom Tambak
 Kampung Parit Empat
 Kampung Parit Juraimi
 Kampung Sungai Tongkang
 Kampung Sungai Tongkang Darat
 Kampung Parit Perpat Laut
 Kampung Parit Perpat
 Kampung Parit Lapis Perpat
 Kampung Parit Perpat Darat
 Kampung Sungai Mengkudu
 Kampung Punggur Kecil
 Kampung Punggur Laut Timur
 Kampung Punggur Laut Barat
 Kampung Punggur Besar
 Kampung Punggur Darat
 Kampung Nelayan
 Kampung Parit Haji Abdul Rahman
 Desa Seri Rejo Sari

References 

Mukims of Batu Pahat District